Don Parkinson is a New Zealand former rugby league footballer who represented New Zealand in 1968.

Playing career
From Huntly, Parkinson played for the Taniwharau Rugby League Club and represented Waikato. A hooker, Parkinson represented the Kiwis in 1968.

Later years
In 2005 Parkinson was fined and sentenced to 400 hours' community work after he had mistakenly shot another hunter while out deer hunting.

References

Living people
New Zealand national rugby league team players
New Zealand rugby league players
Rugby league hookers
Rugby league players from Huntly, New Zealand
Taniwharau Rugby League Club players
Waikato rugby league team players
Year of birth missing (living people)